eSkootr Championship (eSC) is an electric scooter racing series which launched its debut season in 2022. Races are taking place in several city centre locations across the world. The series was conceived by motorsport entrepreneur Hrag Sarkissian and former racing driver Khalil Beshir. Lucas Di Grassi serve as sustainability ambassador, while Alexander Wurz has the role of the safety ambassador. Swiss rider Matis Neyroud won the first race.

S1-X eSkootr 

Developed especially for the series with help from Italian motorsports engineering and lightweight composites company Ycom, the S1-X eSkootr, which all riders will race with, will be able to reach speeds of more than 100 km/h with a lean of greater than 50 degrees. They will include twin 6 kW motors and a battery developed by Williams Advanced Engineering with a capacity of 1.33kWh.

Calendar 
For eSC's inaugural season, six rounds were originally announced, with the first in London in May 2022. The championship was scheduled to remain in Europe before finishing in the United States in October.

Before the third planned race in Italy, the remaining races were postponed before it was announced that the season would conclude with a double-header event at Circuit Paul Ricard near Marseille, moving the competition to a purpose-built racing circuit for the first time. 

The London race was staged at multi-purpose venue Printworks London in the east of the city.

The inaugural riders' championship was won by Aymard Vernay while Nico Roche Racing won the teams' championship. 

The following rounds were planned, but subsequently cancelled:

Teams and riders 
Riders for the series are professional athletes from a range of sporting backgrounds, including existing racing disciplines within motorsports and BMX as well as freestyle scooters plus ones as varied as figure skating (Jordan Rand) and snowboarding (Billy Morgan). They will be a part of the eSC Draft. Similar to the NFL style draft in America, these riders will be selected in rotation by the teams.

The confirmed teams so far are the Carlin, Helbiz, Nico Roche Racing Team, Murphy Prototypes, SICK! Series Racing (owned by Fabio Wibmer), 27X by Nico Hulkenberg and 258 Racing (owned by Anthony Joshua).

References

External links 
Official website

Motorsport
Electric scooters